The George J. Sherman Family Sports Complex is an AstroTurf field on the campus of the University of Connecticut in Storrs, Connecticut. Its seating capacity is 2,000.
It is home to the school's field hockey and lacrosse teams as well as the outdoor track program. It hosted the semifinals and final of the 1997 NCAA Division I Field Hockey Championship. Sherman also has played host to the Big East Conference Field Hockey Tournament five times - 1996, 2000, 2008, 2010, and 2013. In 2015, it hosted the Big East women's lacrosse tournament for the first time.

References

UConn Huskies field hockey
UConn Huskies sports venues
College field hockey venues in the United States
College lacrosse venues in the United States
Lacrosse venues in Connecticut